Charles William Eckert (August 8, 1897 – August 22, 1986), nicknamed "Buzz", was a Major League Baseball pitcher. He continued to pitch in the minors until .

References

External links

Major League Baseball pitchers
Philadelphia Athletics players
Suffolk Nuts players
Portland Beavers players
Vernon Tigers players
Mission Bells players
Little Rock Travelers players
Harrisburg Senators players
Hazleton Mountaineers players
Reading Red Sox players
Reading Brooks players
Allentown Brooks players
Fulton Tigers players
Baseball players from Pennsylvania
1897 births
1986 deaths
Minor league baseball managers